Pocklington is a surname. Notable people with the surname include:

Henry Cabourn Pocklington (1870–1952), English teacher, physicist, and mathematician
Jeremy Pocklington (born 1973), British civil servant
Jim Pocklington (born 1963), British racing driver
Peter Pocklington (born 1941), Canadian entrepreneur